The House of Starhemberg is the name of an old and distinguished Austrian noble family originating from Upper Austria, specifically Steyr and Steinbach. Members of the family played important political role within the Holy Roman Empire and later in the Austro-Hungarian Empire.

History

The first known member Gundaker I von Steyr was mentioned in the 12th century. In 1150, he married Richezza von Steinbach (Richezza nobilis matrona de Steinpach), and through her he inherited Steinbach in 1160. They were made by imperial counts (Reichsgrafen) in 1643 by Emperor Ferdinand III, and were later raised to princely rank (Reichsfürsten) in 1765 by Joseph II, Holy Roman Emperor. In 1806, the Princes of Starhemberg lost their independence through mediatisation initialized by Napoleon and lost its sovereign rights, but allowed to retain equality of birth with other reigning families, which was an important fact for marriage purposes. The family belongs to the small circle of high nobility, and their Starhemberg Palace (German: Schloss Starhemberg) in Eferding, Upper Austria, includes a museum about the family's history.

Mediatized Princes of Starhemberg 

  Camillo, 4th Prince (1804-1872)
  Camillo, 5th Prince 1872-1900 (1835-1900)
  Ernst Rüdiger, 6th Prince 1900-1927 (1861-1927)
 Ernst Rüdiger, 7th Prince 1927-1956 (1899-1956)
  Heinrich, 8th Prince 1956-1997 (1934-1997)
  Prince Georg (1904-1978)
  Prince Franz (1933-1995)
 Georg Adam, 9th Prince 1997–present (b.1961)
 Constantin, Hereditary Prince of Starhemberg (b.1992)
  Prince Ernst (b.1995)
  Prince Franz (b.1963)
  Prince Nicolaus (b.2001)

Notable family members 

 Eberhard IV of Starhemberg (ca 1370–1429), Archbishop of Salzburg from 1427 until his death
 Erasmus of Starhemberg (1503-1560), Austrian noble
 Bohunka Starhemberg (died 1530), wife of the Bohemian noble Jost III of Rosenberg, who died at the birth of their daughter
 Count Ernst Rüdiger von Starhemberg (1638–1701), Austrian politician, field marshal, the defender of Vienna against the Turks in 1683, commander of the Vienna city defence
 Maximilian Lorenz Starhemberg (ca 1640–89), Imperial field marshal and commander of the fortress of Philippsburg, brother of Ernst Rüdiger
 Gundaker Thomas Starhemberg (1663–1745), half-brother of Ernst Rüdiger, financial expert
 Guido Starhemberg (1657–1737), Austrian commander during the War of the Spanish Succession
 Maximilian Adam Graf Starhemberg (1669-1741), brother of Guido and also Austrian field Marshal.  
 Maria Eva Sophia of Starhemberg (1722–73), married William Hyacinth, Prince of Nassau-Siegen and Constantine, Landgrave of Hesse-Rotenburg 
 Georg Adam, Prince of Starhemberg (1724-1807), Austrian Ambassador in France
 Ludwig, Prince of Starhemberg (1762-1833), Austrian Ambassador in the United Kingdom 
 Ernst Rüdiger von Starhemberg (1861–1927), Austrian politician and landowner
 Fanny von Starhemberg (1875–1943), Austrian politician for the Christian Social Party
 Ernst Rüdiger Starhemberg (1899–1956), Austrian politician, Vice-Chancellor of Austria and Heimwehr
 Heinrich Starhemberg (1934–97), son of Ernst Rüdiger and Nora Gregor, actor and writer using the pseudonym Henry Gregor

References

Further reading
 Genealogisches Handbuch des Adels, Adelslexikon Band XIV, Gesamtreihe Band 131, C. A. Starke Verlag, Limburg/Lahn, 2003, pp. 24–26 (in German).

External links

 Official website of the Starhemberg family (in German)
 Starhemberg Castle website (in German)

Austrian noble families
Austrian princes
States and territories established in 1643

History of Upper Austria
1643 establishments in the Holy Roman Empire
1806 disestablishments in the Holy Roman Empire